Kampfretter is a special operations force of the German Air Force, tasked with combat search and rescue (CSAR) missions.
As part of personnel recovery Kampfretter units are tasked with the recovery of air crews and personnel in hazardous regions or behind enemy lines.

Selection and training
Candidates for serving as part of the Kampfretter units are recruited from the German Air Force Regiment. In order to increase the number of candidates, recruitment is being opened continuously for members of the German Army's Rapid Forces Division. The completion of basic infantry training and an enlistment of 20 years is required for prospective members.
Candidates undergo a strict selection process which is followed by training in:

 Specialized infantry training
 Completion of German commando course
 Parachutist course including HALO/HAHO qualification
 Rappelling/fast-roping
 Mountain rescue
 SERE training
 Close quarter fighting
 Extraction via helicopter
 Medical training

The completion of the entire training circle may take up to two years.

Mission and deployments 
Since their establishment Kampfretter personnel have been deployed as part of the NATO-led Resolute Support Mission in Afghanistan.

Along with the German Army's KSK Kampfretter were among the first to respond to the 2016 bombing of the German consulate at Mazar-i-Sharif.

See also 
 United States Air Force Pararescue
 European Personnel Recovery Centre

References 

Special forces of Germany
Airborne units and formations of Germany
Units and formations of the German Army (1956–present)
German Air Force
Search and rescue